Cuero Municipal Airport  is a public airport located approximately  east-southeast of Cuero, Texas.  It provides general aviation service.

History

Opened on 1 April 1941 with 5000ft all-way turf runway (same location as present day Dewitt County Prison, hangars still used). Began training United States Army Air Corps flying cadets under contract to Brayton Flying Service, Inc.
Assigned to United States Army Air Forces Gulf Coast Training Center (later Central Flying Training Command) as a primary (level 1) pilot training airfield.
had four local axillary airfields for emergency and overflow landings.
Flight training was performed with Fairchild PT-19s as the primary trainer. Also had several PT-17 Stearmans and a few old Curtiss P-1 Hawks and Airco DH.4s assigned.

Deactivated on 4 August 1944 with the drawdown of AAFTC's pilot training program.
Declared surplus and turned over to the Army Corps of Engineers on 30 September 1945.
Eventually discharged to the War Assets Administration (WAA) and became a civil airport.

Present
As of February 2015, there are 2 hangars and 4 tie downs for general aviation aircraft.

See also

 Texas World War II Army Airfields
 31st Flying Training Wing (World War II)

References

 Manning, Thomas A. (2005), History of Air Education and Training Command, 1942–2002.  Office of History and Research, Headquarters, AETC, Randolph AFB, Texas 
 Shaw, Frederick J. (2004), Locating Air Force Base Sites, History’s Legacy, Air Force History and Museums Program, United States Air Force, Washington DC.

External links
 
 

1941 establishments in Texas
USAAF Contract Flying School Airfields
Airfields of the United States Army Air Forces in Texas
Buildings and structures in DeWitt County, Texas
Transportation in DeWitt County, Texas